The 2011–12 Yemeni League is the 20th edition of top-level football in Yemen.

The season started on December 28 between last season's top two teams; Al-Tilal Aden and Al-Oruba Zabid and finished on July 16. The season was due to finish on 15 July but the final two games of the season were postponed until the next day due to heavy rainfall. The deciding games featured the top three sides of the league and decided who would be champions. The league winners and runners up qualify for the AFC Cup. The bottom four teams will be relegated.

Teams
Al-Wahda San'a', Hassan Abyan, Al-Saqr and Al Rasheed Ta'izz were relegated to the second tier after finishing in the bottom four places of the 2010–11 Yemeni League season. They were replaced by Al-Wahda Aden, Al-Shula, Al-Tali'aa Taizz and Najm Sba. Three teams would each represent the capital San'a and the city of Aden bringing some big rivalries to the domestic game.

Stadia and locations

Al Oruba appear to represent the small town of Zabid, but play all games in San'a'.

League standings

Championship playoff
Because the top two teams finish with the same number of points, a championship playoff was played to determine the champions of Yemen for 2011–2012 season.

As league champions, Al-Shaab Ibb qualified for the 2013 AFC Cup Group stage.

Awards and season statistics

Top goalscorers

Source: goalzz

References 

Yemeni League seasons
Yem
1